Smarts may refer to:

 SMARTS, market analysis and surveillance software by Nasdaq
 Smiles arbitrary target specification,  a line notation language for specifying molecular query patterns
 Smarts Mountain, a mountain in New Hampshire
 Small and Medium Research Telescope System (SMARTS), a group of telescopes at Cerro Tololo Inter-American Observatory
 Simple Model of the Atmospheric Radiative Transfer of Sunshine or SMARTS, a computer programme

See also 
 Smart (disambiguation)